Ben McLachlan and Jan-Lennard Struff were the defending champions, but chose not to participate together. McLachlan teamed up with Luke Bambridge, but lost in the first round to Divij Sharan and Artem Sitak. Struff played alongside Lucas Pouille, but lost in the semifinals to Nikola Mektić and Franko Škugor.

Nicolas Mahut and Édouard Roger-Vasselin won the title, defeating Mektić and Škugor in the final, 7–6(9–7), 6–4.

Seeds

Draw

Draw

Qualifying

Seeds

Qualifiers
  Divij Sharan /  Artem Sitak

Qualifying draw

References
 Main Draw
 Qualifying Draw

Doubles